Senator Burlingame may refer to:

Alvah W. Burlingame Jr. (1879–1952), New York State Senate
Anson Burlingame (1820–1870), Massachusetts State Senate